Ça va bien aller is the French translation of the Italian slogan andrà tutto bene, which emerged during the COVID-19 pandemic in Italy, while the country was in lockdown. Italians posted signs with rainbows accompanied by the slogan.

A viral phenomenon, the phrase was used and translated in other countries, though it was used predominantly in Italy and in Quebéc, Canada.

Translations

The slogan has several translations:

French
 Ça va bien aller (Québec)
 Tout ira bien
 Tout ira mieux (Belgium)

English
 Everything is going to be alright
 Everything will be alright
 It's going to be okay

Usage

Italy
The singer Elisa co-wrote the single "Andrà tutto bene" during the original quarantine period applied in Italy early in the pandemic.

Quebec

The slogan was translated in Québec as "ça va bien aller" (in English, similar to "it will be okay", although English translations of the phrase in Québec vary), an expression typically used during more disconcerting events. The phrase was written and circulated alongside images of rainbows with clouds on either end, and typically posted on residential windows. It was also distributed online with the hashtag #cavabienaller.

On 14 March 2020, she asked students in her class to create rainbows with clouds on either end including the phrase. Cucinelli posted a photo of the drawings on a Facebook group for educators.

According to Radio-Canada, a second teacher in Lanaudière, Karine Laurier, asked her students to create similar drawings, and also posted the results of the project on Facebook.

The phrase has been criticized as being overly positive. Critics argue that the phrase is a way of ignoring the broader issue of COVID-19, generally by dismissing the difficulties of those suffering from the virus, people affected by the COVID-19 recession, and the increased workload for health professionals. It is also considered a way to deflect blame for mishandling of the crisis by the Québec government.

References

COVID-19 pandemic in Canada
COVID-19 pandemic in Italy